is a 2020 role-playing video game developed by Nihon Falcom. The game is a part of the Trails series, itself a part of the larger The Legend of Heroes series. It was released in Japan for the PlayStation 4 in August 2020, with ports for the Nintendo Switch and Windows released in August 2021. An English release is scheduled for July 2023, additionally being ported to PlayStation 5. Trails into Reverie is considered the end of the series' Crossbell and Erebonia arcs and serves as the precursor to The Legend of Heroes: Kuro no Kiseki.

Gameplay
Trails into Reverie plays similarly to the Trails of Cold Steel tetralogy, being a traditional Japanese role-playing video game with turn-based battles. The game features a new Crossroads system where players can switch between three different story arcs, with each focusing on a different protagonist: the leader of Crossbell's Special Support Section, Lloyd Bannings, the instructor of Class VII, Rean Schwarzer, and the masked character "C".

The game features over 50 playable characters.

Plot
The game takes place five months after the end of the Great Twilight. Crossbell's Special Support Section (SSS) led by Lloyd Bannings, oust the remaining imperial forces from Crossbell and reclaim independence. Later they're preparing the city for the reindependence ceremony, but once started, it's interrupted by Rufus Albarea, the former Governor General of Crossbell and the righthand man of the deceased Chancellor Osborne who's seemingly freed from prison. He easily overpowers the SSS and forces them to retreat, he then reclaims Crossbell as his territory and reveals his intention of uniting the world under the branch of Crossbell Unified nation with him as the Supreme Leader. 

At the same time in Erebonia, Rean Schwarzer and his students are having a vacation in Ymir, Rean's hometown where they are approached by Kurt's father Matteus Vander, who recruits them to find the missing Prince Olivert and his wife. Rean assembles the members of Class VII and together start looking for clues in the capital, where they cross paths with a group led by mysterious "C". They discover that C is Rufus, who denies his actions as the Supreme Leader and instructs the Class VII to look for the missing prince in Nord Highlands.

Meanwhile, Rufus and his team, consisting of Swin Abel and Nadia Rayne, defectors of a secret society known as Garden, as well as Lapis Rosenberg, a sentient doll are investigating Rufus's "doppelganger" in Crossbell and the source of his power, receiving help from Duvalie the Swift and Renne Bright, defectors of Ouroboros as well as Arios Maclaine, a famous bracer of Crossbell. They discover that Lapis is the personality of a singularity named Elysium, which possesses powerful calculation abilities and can bring them to life.

the SSS, Thors Class VII, Rufus's team and the Liberlian bracers join together to liberate Crossbell and succeed, but it is revealed that the Supreme Leader was another puppet as a weapon suddenly appears out of nowhere and threatens the world.

The heroes later assault the weapon and discover the true mastermind is an alternative version of Rean from another timeline calculated by Elysium in which Rean did not separate Ishmelga from himself and became "Ishmelga-Rean", the Awakener and pilot of the fully reforged Great One. The unlikely existence of the Great One allows the spirits of Valimar, Ordine and El-Prado to come to their aid and Rean successfully separates his other self from Ishmelga while Lapis deactivates Elysium, wiping the Great One out of existence in the process. With its dying breath, Ishmelga sets the weapon on destroying whatever humans hate, while the others escape, Rufus remains behind and announces to the world that he is responsible for the recent incident and thus driving humanity's hate to himself and the weapon, but Lapis, Swin, Nadia, Lloyd, the SSS dog Zeit and Rufus's cousin and step brother Jusis save him before the weapon destroys itself.

Rufus survives his injuries and is free to go since the world believes he is dead, although he will not be allowed to enter Erebonia freely, as doing so would result in his arrest and execution. With no threat of reannexation, the heroes watch as Crossbell goes with the reindependence ceremony and gains a permanent freedom.

The game contains multiple side-stories, some leading up to the main story, and others foreshadowing the events of Kuro no Kiseki.

Development and release
The game was announced by Nihon Falcom in December 2019 for the PlayStation 4. It was released in Japan on August 27, 2020. Ports for the Nintendo Switch and Windows were released on August 26, 2021, by Clouded Leopard Entertainment in Japan. Like the Trails of Cold Steel games, Trails into Reverie was made using the PhyreEngine game engine and was the last game by Nihon Falcom to use it. NIS America plans to release the game in English as Trails into Reverie for PlayStation 4, PlayStation 5, Windows, and Switch on July 7, 2023 in North America and Europe, and on July 14 in Australasia.

Notes

References

External links
 

2020 video games
Japanese role-playing video games
Nihon Falcom games
Nintendo Switch games
Nippon Ichi Software games
PhyreEngine games
PlayStation 4 games
PlayStation 5 games
Role-playing video games
Single-player video games
The Legend of Heroes
Trails (series)
Video game sequels
Video games about multiple time paths
Video games about police officers
Video games developed in Japan
Windows games